Tyrece Martel D'Von Radford (born April 22, 1999) is an American college basketball player for the Texas A&M Aggies of the Southeastern Conference (SEC). He previously played for the Virginia Tech Hokies.

High school career
Radford played basketball for McKinley High School in Baton Rouge, Louisiana. As a junior, he averaged 17.8 points, 4.5 rebounds and 4.2 assists per game. In his senior season, Radford averaged 22 points, six rebounds and four assists per game. He was unranked by recruiting services and signed to play college basketball for Virginia Tech, although he was not announced by the program due to questions about his academic eligibility.

College career
Radford redshirted his first season at Virginia Tech for academic reasons. On February 19, 2020, he posted a career-high 26 points and 10 rebounds in a 102–95 triple overtime loss to Miami (Florida). As a freshman, he averaged 10.2 points and 6.2 rebounds per game. On January 25, 2021, Radford was suspended indefinitely after being arrested for driving under the influence and carrying a concealed weapon. Virginia Tech lifted the suspension on February 23. As a sophomore, Radford averaged 12.2 points, 5.9 rebounds and 2.1 assists per game, earning All-Atlantic Coast Conference honorable mention. The charges against him for allegedly failing to comply with the term of his Virginia Alcohol Safety Action Program, after getting positive readings on the ignition interlock device, were dismissed in August 2021. For his junior season, he transferred to Texas A&M, reuniting with former Virginia Tech head coach Buzz Williams. Radford averaged 10.9 points and 6.2 rebounds per game.

Career statistics

College

|-
| style="text-align:left;"| 2018–19
| style="text-align:left;"| Virginia Tech
| style="text-align:center;" colspan="11"|  Redshirt
|-
| style="text-align:left;"| 2019–20
| style="text-align:left;"| Virginia Tech
| 32 || 29 || 26.3 || .604 || .083 || .691 || 6.2 || 1.7 || 1.0 || 0.3 || 10.2
|-
| style="text-align:left;"| 2020–21
| style="text-align:left;"| Virginia Tech
| 18 || 18 || 32.2 || .550 || .292 || .766 || 5.9 || 2.1 || 0.6 || 0.4 || 12.2
|-
| style="text-align:left;"| 2021–22
| style="text-align:left;"| Texas A&M
| 40 || 40 || 30.1 || .487 || .402 || .671 || 6.2 || 1.4 || 1.2 || 0.3 || 10.9
|-
| style="text-align:left;"| 2022–23
| style="text-align:left;"| Texas A&M
| 24 || 24 || 30.1 || .423 || .357 || .789 || 5.4 || 2.3 || 0.8 || 0.3 || 13.6
|- class="sortbottom"
| style="text-align:center;" colspan="2"| Career
| 114 || 111 || 29.4 || .509 || .359 || .737 || 6.0 || 1.8 || 0.9 || 0.3 || 11.5

Personal life
Radford is the son of Ben Radford. He was named after Tyrese Gibson, a singer that his father liked. In December 2015, Radford's best friend, Kejohn Davis-Carroll, was shot and killed at age 16 by a friend who was playing with a loaded gun.

References

External links
Texas A&M Aggies bio
Virginia Tech Hokies bio

1999 births
Living people
American men's basketball players
Basketball players from Louisiana
Point guards
Shooting guards
Sportspeople from Baton Rouge, Louisiana
Texas A&M Aggies men's basketball players
Virginia Tech Hokies men's basketball players